Sripada or Sri Pada, also spelled Shripada or Sreepada, may refer to:

People
 Sripada Kameswara Rao
 Sripada Krishnamurty Sastry, Indian writer
 Sripada Pinakapani, Indian musician
 Sripada Subrahmanya Sastry
 T. K. Sreepada Rao, is a nephrologist of Indian origin

Other
 Adam's Peak, also known as Sri Pada, a tall conical mountain located in central Sri Lanka
 Sripada Yellampalli project
 Sripada Sri Vallabha, an incarnation of Lord Dattatreya who lived in Pithapuram, Andhra Pradesh, India
 Sripadaraja

Indian masculine given names